The 1440s decade ran from January 1, 1440, to December 31, 1449.

Significant people

References